Gambling for resurrection is a situation in international relations when a leader weakened domestically is willing to risk war or prolong war to maintain office.

Theory 
Leaders who are weakened domestically often undertake risky policies to avoid undesirable developments for them personally. The fear of removal from office due to poor performance or bad luck may prompt a leader to instigate a diversionary war he or she might not rationally have started, in the hope that should it go well he or she would stay in power, or at least receiving a surge in personal popularity and patriotism to sustain them in power.  Gambling for resurrection can also consist of a leader prolonging an existing war that should rationally be ended, fearing removal from office or punishment (imprisonment, exile, or death). The leader thus continues the war against the country's interest, adopting risky military strategies in the hope of a dramatic reversal of fortune in the war's outcome. In this situation, escalation is more attractive than peace because the losses are below the removal threshold for the leader's constituency. Once the constituency seem determined to remove the leader from office, it has no other sanction to apply to the leader. The executive, then, has nothing to risk in further escalation, but may win his right to stay in office should the gamble be successful.

Examples
It is seldom possible to provide conclusive proof that a leader's decision to go to war or prolong war is motivated by personal or domestic political issues.  However, some conflicts may be seen as Gambles for Resurrection, including:

 The Argentinian invasion of the Falkland/Malvinas Islands, which was seen as a distraction from President Leopoldo Galtieri's domestic problems, and an attempt to unify the country in its territorial claim over the islands.  After her victory in the conflict Margaret Thatcher called a Khaki election in the UK, winning decisively, and Galtieri was ousted the same year.
President Bill Clinton was involved in a sex scandal and started three military strikes in 1998 against Iraq, targets in the Sudan and Afghanistan, and Serbia in the heat of the scandal.  This followed just three months after the release of the film "Wag the dog" (see below), and apparently mirrored the film's theme.
Adolf Hitler refused to surrender at the end of the Second World War, when defeat was inevitable and surrender was in the best interests of Germany.  His suicide may be seen as an attempt to preserve his historical reputation, though his mental state is uncertain.

Pop culture influence
Gambling for resurrection is often referred to in the mainstream media as "Wag the dog," a reference to a 1997 film by the same name in which a fictional President of the United States starts a fake diversionary war to distract the American public from a sex scandal.

References

External links
Regime Type and Costly Conflict: A Competing Risks Analysis of Interstate War Duration, Alex Weisiger, Ph.D Candidate Columbia University

International relations